was a Japanese politician of the Liberal Democratic Party, a member of the House of Representatives in the Diet (national legislature). A native of Tatebayashi, Gunma and graduate of Hosei University, he was elected to the first of his three terms in the assembly of Gunma Prefecture in 1975 and to the House of Representatives for the first time in 1986. After losing his seat in 1990, he was re-elected in the same year. From 2000 to 2001 he served as the Minister of Agriculture, Forestry and Fisheries.

References

External links
 Official website in Japanese.

1934 births
2021 deaths
Liberal Democratic Party (Japan) politicians
Ministers of Agriculture, Forestry and Fisheries of Japan
Members of the House of Representatives (Japan)
Hosei University alumni
21st-century Japanese politicians
Politicians from Gunma Prefecture